Platypedia mohavensis is a species of cicada in the family Cicadidae. It is found in North America.

Subspecies
These two subspecies belong to the species Platypedia mohavensis:
 Platypedia mohavensis mohavensis Davis, 1920
 Platypedia mohavensis rufescens Davis, 1932

References

Further reading

 

Articles created by Qbugbot
Insects described in 1920
Platypediini